Domestication is a sustained multi-generational relationship in  which humans assume a significant degree of control over the reproduction and care of another group of organisms to secure a more predictable supply of resources from that group. A broader biological definition is that it is a coevolutionary process that arises from a mutualism, in which one species (the domesticator) constructs an environment where it actively manages both the survival and reproduction of another species (the domesticate) in order to provide the former with resources and/or services. The domestication of plants and animals by humans was a major cultural innovation ranked in importance with the conquest of fire, the manufacturing of tools, and the development of verbal language.

Charles Darwin recognized the small number of traits that made domestic species different from their wild ancestors. He was also the first to recognize the difference between conscious selective breeding (i.e. artificial selection) in which humans directly select for desirable traits, and unconscious selection where traits evolve as a by-product of natural selection or from selection on other traits. There is a genetic difference between domestic and wild populations. There is also such a difference between the domestication traits that researchers believe to have been essential at the early stages of domestication, and the improvement traits that have appeared since the split between wild and domestic populations. Domestication traits are generally fixed within all domesticates, and were selected during the initial episode of domestication of that animal or plant, whereas improvement traits are present only in a proportion of domesticates, though they may be fixed in individual breeds or regional populations.

The dog was the first domesticated species, and was established across Eurasia before the end of the Late Pleistocene era, well before cultivation and the domestication of other animals. The archaeological and genetic data suggest that long-term bidirectional gene flow between wild and domestic stocks – including donkeys,  horses, New and Old World camelids, goats, sheep, and pigs – was common. Given its importance to humans and its value as a model of evolutionary and demographic change, domestication has attracted scientists from archaeology, paleontology, anthropology, botany, zoology, genetics, and the environmental sciences.
Among birds, the major domestic species today is the chicken, important for meat and eggs, though economically valuable poultry include the turkey, guineafowl and numerous other species. Birds are also widely kept as cagebirds, from songbirds to parrots. The longest established invertebrate domesticates are the honey bee and the silkworm. Land snails are raised for food, while species from several phyla are kept for research, and others are bred for biological control.

The domestication of plants began at least 12,000 years ago with cereals in the Middle East, and the bottle gourd in Asia. Agriculture developed in at least 11 different centres around the world, domesticating different crops and animals.

Overview

Domestication, from the Latin , 'belonging to the house', is "a sustained multi-generational, mutualistic relationship in which one organism assumes a significant degree of influence over the reproduction and care of another organism in order to secure a more predictable supply of a resource of interest, and through which the partner organism gains advantage over individuals that remain outside this relationship, thereby benefitting and often increasing the fitness of both the domesticator and the target domesticate." Another related definition is that domestication "is a coevolutionary process that arises from a mutualism, in which one species (the domesticator) constructs an environment where it actively manages both the survival and reproduction of another species (the domesticate) in order to provide the former with resources and/or services. This allows for increased fitness for the interacting organisms within the mutualistic relationship, leading to the evolution of traits that ensures the stable association of domesticator and domesticate across generations." These definitions recognize both the biological and the cultural components of the human-associated domestication process and the impacts on both humans and the domesticated animals and plants. All past definitions of domestication have included a relationship between humans with plants and animals, but their differences lay in who was considered as the lead partner in the relationship. These new definitions recognize a mutualistic relationship in which both partners gain benefits. Domestication has vastly enhanced the reproductive output of crop plants, livestock, and pets far beyond that of their wild progenitors. Domesticates have provided humans with resources that they could more predictably and securely control, move, and redistribute, which has been the advantage that had fueled a population explosion of the agro-pastoralists and their spread to all corners of the planet.

Houseplants and ornamentals are plants domesticated primarily for aesthetic enjoyment in and around the home, while those domesticated for large-scale food production are called crops. Domesticated plants deliberately altered or selected for special desirable characteristics are cultigens. Animals domesticated for home companionship are called pets, while those domesticated for food or work are known as livestock.

This biological mutualism is not restricted to humans with domestic crops and livestock but is well-documented in nonhuman species, especially among a number of social insect domesticators and their plant and animal domesticates, for example the ant–fungus mutualism that exists between leafcutter ants and certain fungi.

Domestication syndrome is the suite of phenotypic traits arising during domestication that distinguish crops from their wild ancestors. The term is also applied to vertebrate animals, and includes increased docility and tameness, coat color changes, reductions in tooth size, changes in craniofacial morphology, alterations in ear and tail form (e.g., floppy ears), more frequent and no seasonal estrus cycles, alterations in adrenocorticotropic hormone levels, changed concentrations of several neurotransmitters, prolongations in juvenile behavior, and reductions in both total brain size and of particular brain regions.

History

Cause and timing

The domestication of animals and plants was triggered by the climatic and environmental changes that occurred after the peak of the Last Glacial Maximum around 21,000 years ago and which continue to this present day. These changes made obtaining food difficult. The first domesticate was the wolf (Canis lupus) at least 15,000 years ago. The Younger Dryas that occurred 12,900 years ago was a period of intense cold and aridity that put pressure on humans to intensify their foraging strategies. By the beginning of the Holocene from 11,700 years ago, favorable climatic conditions and increasing human populations led to small-scale animal and plant domestication, which allowed humans to augment the food that they were obtaining through hunter-gathering.

The Neolithic transition led to agricultural societies emerging in locations across Eurasia, North Africa, and South and Central America. In the Fertile Crescent 10,000-11,000 years ago, zooarchaeology indicates that goats, pigs, sheep, and taurine cattle were the first livestock to be domesticated. Two thousand years later, humped zebu cattle were domesticated in what is today Baluchistan in Pakistan. In East Asia 8,000 years ago, pigs were domesticated from wild boar that were genetically different from those found in the Fertile Crescent. The horse was domesticated on the Central Asian steppe 5,500 years ago. Both the chicken in Southeast Asia and the cat in Egypt were domesticated 4,000 years ago.

The sudden appearance of the domestic dog (Canis lupus familiaris) in the archaeological record then led to a rapid shift in the evolution, ecology, and demography of both humans and numerous species of animals and plants. It was followed by livestock and crop domestication, and the transition of humans from foraging to farming in different places and times across the planet. Around 10,000 YBP, a new way of life emerged for humans through the management and exploitation of plant and animal species, leading to higher-density populations in the centers of domestication, the expansion of agricultural economies, and the development of urban communities.

Animals

Theory

The domestication of animals is the relationship between animals and humans who have influence on their care and reproduction. Charles Darwin recognized the small number of traits that made domestic species different from their wild ancestors. He was also the first to recognize the difference between conscious selective breeding in which humans directly select for desirable traits, and unconscious selection where traits evolve as a by-product of natural selection or from selection on other traits.

There is a difference between domestic and wild populations, though studies suggest domestication as a form of survival for most animals under human care. There is also such a difference between the domestication traits that researchers believe to have been essential at the early stages of domestication, and the improvement traits that have appeared since the split between wild and domestic populations. Domestication traits are generally fixed within all domesticates, and were selected during the initial episode of domestication of that animal or plant, whereas improvement traits are present only in a proportion of domesticates, though they may be fixed in individual breeds or regional populations.

Domestication of animals should not be confused with taming. Taming is the conditioned behavioral modification of an individual animal, to reduce its natural avoidance of humans, and to tolerate the presence of humans. Domestication is the permanent genetic modification of a bred lineage that leads to an inherited predisposition to respond calmly to human presence.

Certain animal species, and certain individuals within those species, make better candidates for domestication merely for their inability to defend themselves. These animals exhibit certain behavioral characteristics:
 The size and organization of their social structure
 The availability and the degree of selectivity in their choice of mates
 The ease and speed with which the parents bond with their young, and the maturity and mobility of the young at birth
 The degree of flexibility in diet and habitat tolerance; and
 Responses to humans and new environments, including reduced flight response and reactivity to external stimuli.

Mammals

The beginnings of animal domestication involved a protracted coevolutionary process with multiple stages along different pathways. There are three proposed major pathways that most animal domesticates followed into domestication:
 commensals, adapted to a human niche (e.g., dogs, cats, possibly pigs);
 prey animals sought for food (e.g., sheep, goats, cattle, water buffalo, yak, pig, reindeer, llama and alpaca); and
 animals targeted for draft and non-food resources (e.g., horse, donkey, camel).

The dog was the first domesticant, and was established across Eurasia before the end of the Late Pleistocene era, well before cultivation and before the domestication of other animals. Humans did not intend to domesticate animals from either the commensal or prey pathways, or at least they did not envision a domesticated animal would result from it. In both of those cases, humans became entangled with these species as the relationship between them intensified, and humans' role in their survival and reproduction led gradually to formalised animal husbandry. Although the directed pathway proceeded from capture to taming, the other two pathways are not as goal-oriented, and archaeological records suggest that they took place over much longer time frames.

Unlike other domestic species which were primarily selected for production-related traits, dogs were initially selected for their behaviors. The archaeological and genetic data suggest that long-term bidirectional gene flow between wild and domestic stocks – including donkeys, horses, New and Old World camelids, goats, sheep, and pigs – was common. One study has concluded that human selection for domestic traits likely counteracted the homogenizing effect of gene flow from wild boars into pigs and created domestication islands in the genome. The same process may also apply to other domesticated animals.

Birds

Domesticated birds principally mean poultry, raised for meat and eggs: some Galliformes (chicken, turkey, guineafowl) and Anseriformes (waterfowl: duck, goose, swan). Also widely domesticated are cagebirds such as songbirds and parrots; these are kept both for pleasure and for use in research.
The domestic pigeon has been used both for food and as a means of communication between far-flung places through the exploitation of the pigeon's homing instinct; research suggests it was domesticated as early as 10,000 years ago.
Chicken fossils in China were dated 7,400 years ago. The chicken's wild ancestor is Gallus gallus, the red junglefowl of Southeast Asia. It appears to have been kept initially for cockfighting rather than for food.

Invertebrates

Two insects, the silkworm and the western honey bee, have been domesticated for over 5,000 years, often for commercial use. The silkworm is raised for the silk threads wound around its pupal cocoon; the western honey bee, for honey, and, lately, for pollination of crops.

Several other invertebrates have been domesticated, both terrestrial and aquatic, including some such as Drosophila melanogaster fruit flies and the freshwater cnidarian Hydra for research into genetics and physiology. Few have a long history of domestication. Most are used for food or other products such as shellac and cochineal. The phyla involved are Cnidaria, Platyhelminthes (for biological control), Annelida, Mollusca, Arthropoda (marine crustaceans as well as insects and spiders), and Echinodermata. While many marine molluscs are used for food, only a few have been domesticated, including squid, cuttlefish and octopus, all used in research on behaviour and neurology. Terrestrial snails in the genera Helix and Murex are raised for food. Several parasitic or parasitoidal insects including the fly Eucelatoria, the beetle Chrysolina, and the wasp Aphytis are raised for biological control. Conscious or unconscious artificial selection has many effects on species under domestication; variability can readily be lost by inbreeding, selection against undesired traits, or genetic drift, while in Drosophila, variability in eclosion time (when adults emerge) has increased.

Plants

The initial domestication of animals impacted most on the genes that controlled their behavior, but the initial domestication of plants impacted most on the genes that controlled their morphology (seed size, plant architecture, dispersal mechanisms) and their physiology (timing of germination or ripening).

The domestication of wheat provides an example. Wild wheat shatters and falls to the ground to reseed itself when ripe, but domesticated wheat stays on the stem for easier harvesting. This change was possible because of a random mutation in the wild populations at the beginning of wheat's cultivation. Wheat with this mutation was harvested more frequently and became the seed for the next crop. Therefore, without realizing, early farmers selected for this mutation. The result is domesticated wheat, which relies on farmers for its reproduction and dissemination.

History

The earliest human attempts at plant domestication occurred in the Middle East. There is early evidence for conscious cultivation and trait selection of plants by pre-Neolithic groups in Syria: grains of rye with domestic traits dated 13,000 years ago have been recovered from Abu Hureyra in Syria, but this appears to be a localised phenomenon resulting from cultivation of stands of wild rye, rather than a definitive step towards domestication.

The bottle gourd (Lagenaria siceraria) plant, used as a container before the advent of ceramic technology, appears to have been domesticated 10,000 years ago. The domesticated bottle gourd reached the Americas from Asia by 8,000 years ago, most likely due to the migration of peoples from Asia to America.

Cereal crops were first domesticated around 11,000 years ago in the Fertile Crescent in the Middle East. The first domesticated crops were generally annuals with large seeds or fruits. These included pulses such as peas and grains such as wheat. The Middle East was especially suited to these species; the dry-summer climate was conducive to the evolution of large-seeded annual plants, and the variety of elevations led to a great variety of species. As domestication took place humans began to move from a hunter-gatherer society to a settled agricultural society. This change would eventually lead, some 4000 to 5000 years later, to the first city states and eventually the rise of civilization itself.

Continued domestication was gradual, a process of intermittent trial and error, and often resulted in diverging traits and characteristics. Over time perennials and small trees including the apple and the olive were domesticated. Some plants, such as the macadamia nut and the pecan, were not domesticated until recently.

In other parts of the world very different species were domesticated. In the Americas squash, maize, beans, and perhaps manioc (also known as cassava) formed the core of the diet. In East Asia millet, rice, and soy were the most important crops. Some areas of the world such as Southern Africa, Australia, California and southern South America never saw local species domesticated.

Differences from wild plants

Domesticated plants may differ from their wild relatives in many ways, including
 the way they spread to a more diverse environment and have a wider geographic range;
 different ecological preference (sun, water, temperature, nutrients, etc. requirements), different disease susceptibility;
 conversion from a perennial to annual;
 loss of seed dormancy and photoperiodic controls;
 simultaneous flower and fruit, double flowers;
 a lack of shattering or scattering of seeds, or even loss of their dispersal mechanisms completely;
 less efficient breeding system (e.g. lack normal pollinating organs, making human intervention a requirement), smaller seeds with lower success in the wild, or even complete sexual sterility (e.g. seedless fruits) and therefore only vegetative reproduction;
 less defensive adaptations such as hairs, thorns, spines, and prickles, poison, protective coverings and sturdiness, rendering them more likely to be eaten by animals and pests unless cared by humans;
 chemical composition, giving them better palatability (e.g. sugar content), better smell, and lower toxicity;
 edible part larger, and easier separated from non-edible part (e.g. freestone fruit).

The impact of domestication on the plant microbiome 

The microbiome, defined as the collection of microorganisms inhabiting the surface and internal tissue of plants, has been shown to be affected by plant domestication and breeding. This includes variation the microbial community composition  to change in the number of microbial species associated with plants, i.e., species diversity. Evidence also show that plant lineage, including speciation, domestication, and breeding have shaped the plant endophytes in similar patterns as plant genes.  Such patterns are also known as phylosymbiosis which have been observed in several animal and plant lineages.

Traits that are being genetically improved
There are many challenges facing modern farmers, including climate change, pests, soil salinity, drought, and periods with limited sunlight.

Drought is one of the most serious challenges facing farmers today. With shifting climates comes shifting weather patterns, meaning that regions that could traditionally rely on a substantial amount of precipitation were, quite literally, left out to dry. In light of these conditions, drought resistance in major crop plants has become a clear priority. One method is to identify the genetic basis of drought resistance in naturally drought resistant plants, i.e. the Bambara groundnut. Next, transferring these advantages to otherwise vulnerable crop plants. Rice, which is one of the most vulnerable crops in terms of drought, has been successfully improved by the addition of the Barley hva1 gene into the genome using transgenetics. Drought resistance can also be improved through changes in a plant's root system architecture, such as a root orientation that maximizes water retention and nutrient uptake. There must be a continued focus on the efficient usage of available water on a planet that is expected to have a population in excess of nine-billion people by 2050.

Another specific area of genetic improvement for domesticated crops is the crop plant's uptake and utilization of soil potassium, an essential element for crop plants yield and overall quality. A plant's ability to effectively uptake potassium and use it efficiently is known as its potassium utilization efficiency. It has been suggested that first optimizing plant root architecture and then root potassium uptake activity may effectively improve plant potassium utilization efficiency.

Crop plants that are being genetically improved
Cereals, rice, wheat, corn, sorghum and barley, make up a huge amount of the global diet across all demographic and social scales. These cereal crop plants are all autogamous, i.e. self-fertilizing, which limits overall diversity in allelic combinations, and therefore adaptability to novel environments. To combat this issue the researchers suggest an "Island Model of Genomic Selection". By breaking a single large population of cereal crop plants into several smaller sub-populations which can receive "migrants" from the other subpopulations, new genetic combinations can be generated.

The Bambara groundnut is a durable crop plant that, like many underused crops, has received little attention in an agricultural sense. The Bambara Groundnut is drought resistant and is known to be able to grow in almost any soil conditions, no matter how impoverished an area may be. New genomic and transcriptomic approaches are allowing researchers to improve this relatively small-scale crop, as well as other large-scale crop plants. The reduction in cost, and wide availability of both microarray technology and Next Generation Sequencing have made it possible to analyze underused crops, like the groundnut, at genome-wide level. Not overlooking particular crops that don't appear to hold any value outside of the developing world will be key to not only overall crop improvement, but also to reducing the global dependency on only a few crop plants, which holds many intrinsic dangers to the global population's food supply.

Challenges facing genetic improvement
The semi-arid tropics, ranging from parts of North and South Africa, Asia especially in the South Pacific, all the way to Australia are notorious for being both economically destitute and agriculturally difficult to cultivate and farm effectively. Barriers include everything from lack of rainfall and diseases, to economic isolation and environmental irresponsibility. There is a large interest in the continued efforts, of the International Crops Research Institute for the Semi-Arid Tropics (ICRSAT) to improve staple foods. some mandated crops of ICRISAT include the groundnut, pigeonpea, chickpea, sorghum and pearl millet, which are the main staple foods for nearly one billion people in the semi-arid tropics. As part of the ICRISAT efforts, some wild plant breeds are being used to transfer genes to cultivated crops by interspecific hybridization involving modern methods of embryo rescue and tissue culture. One example of early success has been work to combat the very detrimental peanut clump virus. Transgenetic plants containing the coat protein gene for resistance against peanut clump virus have already been produced successfully. Another region threatened by food security are the Pacific Island Countries, which are disproportionally faced with the negative effects of climate change. The Pacific Islands are largely made up of a chain of small bodies of land, which obviously limits the amount of geographical area in which to farm. This leaves the region with only two viable options 1.) increase agricultural production or 2.) increase food importation. The latter of course runs into the issues of availability and economic feasibility, leaving only the first option as a viable means to solve the region's food crisis.  It is much easier to misuse the limited resources remaining, as compared with solving the problem at its core.

Working with wild plants to improve domestics
Work has also has been focusing on improving domestic crops through the use of crop wild relatives. The amount and depth of genetic material available in crop wild relatives is larger than originally believed, and the range of plants involved, both wild and domestic, is ever expanding. Through the use of new biotechnological tools such as genome editing, cisgenesis/intragenesis, the transfer of genes between crossable donor species including hybrids, and other omic approaches.

Wild plants can be hybridized with crop plants to form perennial crops from annuals, increase yield, growth rate, and resistance to outside pressures like disease and drought. Importantly, these changes take significant lengths of time to achieve, sometimes even decades. However, the outcome can be extremely successful as is the case with a hybrid grass variant known as Kernza. Over the course of nearly three decades, work was done on an attempted hybridization between an already domesticated grass strain, and several of its wild relatives. The domesticated strain as was more uniform in its orientation, but the wild strains were larger and propagated faster. The resulting Kernza crop has traits from both progenitors: uniform orientation and a linearly vertical root system from the domesticated crop, along with increased size and rate of propagation from the wild relatives.

Fungi and micro-organisms

Several species of fungi have been domesticated for use directly as food, or in fermentation to produce foods and drugs. The white button mushroom Agaricus bisporus is widely grown for food. The yeast Saccharomyces cerevisiae have been used for thousands of years to ferment beer and wine, and to leaven bread. Mould fungi including Penicillium are used to mature cheeses and other dairy products, as well as to make drugs such as antibiotics.

Effects

On domestic animals
Selection of animals for visible "desirable" traits may have undesired consequences. Captive and domesticated animals often have smaller size, piebald color, shorter faces with smaller and fewer teeth, diminished horns, weak muscle ridges, and less genetic variability.  Poor joint definition, late fusion of the limb bone epiphyses with the diaphyses, hair changes, greater fat accumulation, smaller brains, simplified behavior patterns, extended immaturity, and more pathology are among the defects of domestic animals.  All of these changes have been documented by archaeological evidence, and confirmed by animal breeders in the 20th century. In 2014, a study proposed the theory that under selection, docility in mammals and birds results partly from a slowed pace of neural crest development, that would in turn cause a reduced fear–startle response due to mild neurocristopathy that causes domestication syndrome. The theory was unable to explain curly tails nor domestication syndrome exhibited by plants.

A side effect of domestication has been zoonotic diseases. For example, cattle have given humanity various viral poxes, measles, and tuberculosis; pigs and ducks have given influenza; and horses have given the rhinoviruses. Many parasites have their origins in domestic animals. The advent of domestication resulted in denser human populations which provided ripe conditions for pathogens to reproduce, mutate, spread, and eventually find a new host in humans.

Paul Shepard writes "Man substitutes controlled breeding for natural selection; animals are selected for special traits like milk production or passivity, at the expense of overall fitness and nature-wide relationships...Though domestication broadens the diversity of forms – that is, increases visible polymorphism – it undermines the crisp demarcations that separate wild species and cripples our recognition of the species as a group. Knowing only domestic animals dulls our understanding of the way in which unity and discontinuity occur as patterns in nature, and substitutes an attention to individuals and breeds. The wide variety of size, color, shape, and form of domestic horses, for example, blurs the distinction among different species of Equus that once were constant and meaningful."

On society
Jared Diamond in his book Guns, Germs, and Steel describes the universal tendency for populations that have acquired agriculture and domestic animals to develop a large population and to expand into new territories. He recounts migrations of people armed with domestic crops overtaking, displacing or killing indigenous hunter-gatherers, whose lifestyle is coming to an end.

Some anarcho-primitivist authors describe domestication as the process by which previously nomadic human populations shifted towards a sedentary or settled existence through agriculture and animal husbandry. They claim that this kind of domestication demands a totalitarian relationship with both the land and the plants and animals being domesticated. They say that whereas, in a state of wildness, all life shares and competes for resources, domestication destroys this balance. Domesticated landscape (e.g. pastoral lands/agricultural fields and, to a lesser degree, horticulture and gardening) ends the open sharing of resources; where "this was everyone's", it is now "mine". Anarcho-primitivists state that this notion of ownership laid the foundation for social hierarchy as property and power emerged. It also involved the destruction, enslavement, or assimilation of other groups of early people who did not make such a transition.

Under the framework of Dialectical naturalism, Murray Bookchin has argued that the basic notion of domestication is incomplete: That, since the domestication of animals is a crucial development within human history, it can also be understood as the domestication of humanity itself in turn. Under this dialectical framework, domestication is always a 'two-way street' with both parties being unavoidably altered by their relationship with each other.

David Nibert, professor of sociology at Wittenberg University, posits that the domestication of animals, which he refers to as "domesecration" as it often involved extreme violence against animal populations and the devastation of the environment, resulted in the corruption of human ethics, and helped pave the way for societies steeped in "conquest, extermination, displacement, repression, coerced and enslaved servitude, gender subordination and sexual exploitation, and hunger."

On diversity

In 2016, a study found that humans have had a major impact on global genetic diversity as well as extinction rates, including a contribution to megafaunal extinctions. Pristine landscapes no longer exist and have not existed for millennia, and humans have concentrated the planet's biomass into human-favored plants and animals. Domesticated ecosystems provide food, reduce predator and natural dangers, and promote commerce, but have also resulted in habitat loss and extinctions commencing in the Late Pleistocene. Ecologists and other researchers are advised to make better use of the archaeological and paleoecological data available for gaining an understanding the history of human impacts before proposing solutions.

See also

 Animal–industrial complex
 Anthrozoology
 Columbian Exchange
 Domestication theory
 Experimental evolution
 Genetic engineering
 Genetic erosion
 Genomics of domestication
 History of plant breeding
 Marker assisted selection
 Pet
 Self-domestication
 Timeline of agriculture and food technology
 Wild ancestors

Notes

References

Further reading
 
 Brian Hare and Vanessa Woods, "Survival of the Friendliest: Natural selection for hypersocial traits enabled Earth's apex species to best Neandertals and other competitors", Scientific American, vol. 323, no. 2 (August 2020), pp. 58–63.

External links

 Crop Wild Relative Inventory and Gap Analysis: reliable information source on where and what to conserve ex-situ, for crop genepools of global importance
 Discussion of animal domestication with Jared Diamond
 The Initial Domestication of Cucurbita pepo in the Americas 10,000 Years Ago
 Cattle domestication diagram 
 Major topic 'domestication': free full-text articles (more than 100 plus reviews) in National Library of Medicine

 
History of agriculture